Poltimore House is an 18th-century country house in Poltimore, Devon, England. The Manor of Poltimore was from the 13th to the 20th century the seat of the Bampfylde family, which acquired the title Baron Poltimore in 1831. The house retains much of the fabric of earlier buildings on the site erected by the family. It is designated a Grade II* listed building.

It fell into a dilapidated condition during the second half of the 20th century. A group of volunteers began raising funds to restore the house in 2003, after it was a finalist in the BBC's Restoration programme, missing out on the funding that went with the top prize.

History

Acquisition by Bampfyldes
The Bampfylde family were bequeathed the Manor of Poltimore in 1298 by William Pontyngton, a canon of Exeter Cathedral.  There is no record of where the early manor house was located, but it is believed to have been situated in or near the village.  There is no evidence of a previous house having occupied the site of the present one. Poltimore House was built by  Richard Bampfylde (1526-1594), who started the works in 1550.

There is no record of when the house was completed, although when Richard died in 1595, he bequeathed the house to his son, Amyas Bampfylde (d.1626), in his will. As Richard had been appointed Sheriff of Devon in 1576, it is likely that his grand house was complete by then.  Two wings of his original house can still be seen in the present building.  It is not known what form the original house took, whether it was just these two wings forming an "L", or if there was a third or even a fourth wing forming a courtyard in the middle. Later members of the family added to the building, the last major building works having been in 1908.

The Politmore estate held a number of tenanted estate farms in the area, such as that at Whipton Barton, at Huxham and Heavitree. Many of these had long standing tenants, such as the Rewes at Whipton Barton, where tenancies spanned hundreds of years.

Sold by Bampfyldes
It was occupied by the Bampfylde family until 1920, when it was offered for sale with its grounds and estate.  The estate was sold but not the house and grounds, which were then leased to house Poltimore College, a girls' school that closed in 1939. In 1940, the boys from Dover College were evacuated to Poltimore House. The House became a private hospital in 1945, which was taken over by the National Health Service when it came into existence in 1948.  It closed as a hospital in 1974.

Dilapidation

It then had a series of owners before suffering an arson attack in 1987 and being left empty from then on.  It suffered from theft and vandalism and fell into a state of dilapidation.

Restoration
In 2000, Poltimore House Trust was set up to find a use for the house and restore it.  The first phase was to encase the house in scaffolding with a roof to protect it, which was done in 2005. In 2009, the Trust secured £500,000 from English Heritage to begin the restoration process.

Future plans
Poltimore House Trust published its 10-year strategic business plan in 2009.  The plan states that the renovated Poltimore House will have become by 2019:
 A showcase for the Arts and Creative Industries: a venue for arts, crafts, media companies, filmmakers and software developers.
 A home for Creative Entrepreneurs: high-specification workspaces, hot-desking and studios with excellent communications.
 The Poltimore Forum: high-profile lectures, workshops and mentoring sessions will bring leading-edge thinkers to the South West.
 The Club at Poltimore House: a meeting venue for the region with super-equipped meeting spaces for briefings, networking and research.
 Intensive innovation: exposing new thinking, practice, learning, skills: linking academia, heritage, industry, technology and the arts.
 A different day out: Poltimore House will attract visitors seeking inspiration, skills and learning, networks, relaxation and fun.

This range of projects is designed to bring Poltimore House and its grounds back to use as an important resource for local and regional businesses, arts and the community.

Public access
The charity Friends of Poltimore House allows public access to Poltimore House at times published on its website.

Charities involved in restoration
 The Friends of Poltimore House, Poltimore House, Poltimore, Exeter, EX4 0AU email: chairman@poltimore.org.uk
 Poltimore House Trust, Poltimore House, Poltimore, Exeter, EX4 0AU email: secretary@poltimore.org

See also
List of Restoration Candidates
Baron Poltimore

References

Further reading

Archaeological Journal, Vol. 31, June 1874, pp. 89-103, Bampfylde House, Exeter
Thomas Wotton (1771), The English Baronetage: Vol 1, London, pp. 374–381, "Bampfylde of Poltimore"
Charles Worthy (1896). Devonshire Wills: A Collection of Annotated Testamentary Abstracts together with the Family History and Genealogy of Many of the Most Ancient Gentle Houses of the West of England London, pp. 474–484, Bampfylde of Poltimore

External links

Trust and Friends of Poltimore House
BBC Devon Features

Country houses in Devon
Grade II* listed buildings in Devon
Buildings and structures in Devon
Tourist attractions in Devon
East Devon District